We The Best Music Group is an American record label founded by DJ Khaled. Previously We The Best operated as an imprint of IDJMG's division Def Jam South, and afterward as an imprint of the Universal Records division Cash Money Records. As of November 2018 until January 2023, We The Best Music Group operated as an imprint of Epic Records. As of February 9, 2023, We The Best currently operates as an imprint of Def Jam Recordings. Current artists signed to We the Best include Khaled, Mavado, Steph Lecor, Kent Jones, Flipp Dinero, and Vado among others.
In February 2023, DJ Khaled Announced that We The Best would be starting a partnership with Def Jam Recordings.

Discography

References 

American record labels
Companies based in Miami
Hip hop record labels
Contemporary R&B record labels
Labels distributed by Universal Music Group